Kaselya is an administrative ward in the Iramba District of the Singida Region of Tanzania. In 2016 the Tanzania National Bureau of Statistics report there were 10,754 people in the ward, from 9,801 in 2012.

References

Wards of Singida Region